The Grand River is a tributary of the Missouri River in South Dakota in the United States. The length of the combined branch is 110 mi (177 km). With its longest fork, its length is approximately 200 mi (320 km).

Variant names
According to the Geographic Names Information System, it has also been known historically as:
Creek of the Rees
Marapa River
Palanat Palanata Wakpa Ree
Ree River
Riviere au Corn
We tar hoo River

Course
It is formed by the confluence of the North Fork (which rises in North Dakota) and the longer South Fork (which rises in South Dakota and passes through the town of Buffalo) in northwestern South Dakota near Shadehill in Perkins County, near several parcels of the Grand River National Grassland. Shadehill Reservoir is located at this confluence. The lower  of the river form an arm of the Lake Oahe reservoir. It is the northernmost of South Dakota's major West River streams: the Grand, Moreau, Cheyenne, Bad, and White. Water quality is high in sodium, and is therefore less appropriate for irrigation. At Wakpala, the river has a mean annual discharge of

History
In 1823, Henry Leavenworth fought the Arikara a few miles north of the mouth of the Grand River during the Arikara War.

Sitting Bull (1831–1890), a Hunkpapa Lakota holy man who led his people as a tribal chief, was born on the Grand River in or nearby Dakota Territory. Decades later, he was killed by Indian agency police on the Standing Rock Indian Agency at his camp near the Grand River, as the police tried to arrest him.

The forks of the Grand was the site of a noted 1823 attack by a grizzly bear on frontiersman Hugh Glass, the inspiration for the 2015 film The Revenant.

See also
List of rivers of North Dakota
List of rivers of South Dakota

References

 Grand River and certain tributaries' uses at SD Legislative Research Council

Rivers of South Dakota
Tributaries of the Missouri River
Rivers of Perkins County, South Dakota